Lawrence William Knechtel (August 4, 1940 – August 20, 2009) was an American keyboard player and bassist who was a member of the Wrecking Crew, a collection of Los Angeles-based session musicians who worked with such renowned artists as Simon & Garfunkel, Duane Eddy, the Beach Boys, the Mamas & the Papas, the Monkees, the Partridge Family, Billy Joel, the Doors, the Grass Roots, Jerry Garcia, and Elvis Presley, and as a member of the 1970s band Bread.

Biography
Born in Bell, California, in 1940, Knechtel began his musical education with piano lessons. In 1957, he joined the Los Angeles-based rock and roll band Kip Tyler and the Flips. In August 1959, he joined instrumentalist Duane Eddy as a member of his band the Rebels. After four years on the road with the band, and continuing to work with Eddy in the recording studio, Knechtel became part of the Los Angeles session musician scene, working with Phil Spector as a pianist to help create Spector's famous "Wall of Sound". Knechtel became a prominent member of session musicians the Wrecking Crew, performing on many hit songs of the period and earning him entry into the Musicians Hall of Fame and Museum in 2007. During his time with the Wrecking Crew, he recorded the album The In Harmonica, playing harmonica under the name "Larry Nelson", with backing by other Wrecking Crew members.

In 1970 Knechtel won a Grammy Award for his piano work on "Bridge over Troubled Water" by Simon and Garfunkel. He also played the piano on Johnny Rivers' 1972 hit "Rockin' Pneumonia and the Boogie Woogie Flu".

Knechtel joined soft rock band Bread in 1971 after the departure of Robb Royer and remained with the band until their split in 1973. He rejoined the band for subsequent comebacks and reunions.

Knechtel was proficient on other musical instruments, notably the harmonica, guitar, and bass, which can be heard on "Mr. Tambourine Man" (with a now iconic bass-line in the song's opening) by the Byrds, "Stoney End" by Barbra Streisand, "If I Can Dream" by Elvis Presley, and the Doors' debut album. In 1971, he joined the band Bread, where his contributions included bass, keyboards, and the guitar solo on the hit single "The Guitar Man". He also played on sessions for Nancy Sinatra.

During the late 1980s, Knechtel moved to Nashville, where he was signed to a solo recording contract. He released two solo albums in quick succession, Mountain Moods (1989) and Urban Gypsy (1990).

In later years, Knechtel lived in semi-retirement in Yakima, Washington, until his death. He had, however, worked with record producer Rick Rubin, contributing keyboards to albums by Neil Diamond, Arlen Roth and the Dixie Chicks, touring with Elvis Costello and with the Dixie Chicks in support of their Grammy Award-winning album Taking the Long Way. During this time Knechtel contributed guest spots on many recordings for dozens of Northwest artists including Wayman Chapman, Ken Stringfellow (Posies, R.E.M., Big Star), Quakers On Probation, Dimestore Mystery, Elba, Animals at Night, Zera Marvel, Colin Spring, Lesley Rostron & Lovejunkie, and his son, Lonnie Knechtel.

Knechtel died on August 20, 2009, in Yakima Valley Memorial Hospital, Washington, at the age of 69 of an apparent heart attack.

Awards and recognition
In 2007 Knechtel, along with the other members of the Wrecking Crew, was inducted into the Musicians Hall of Fame and Museum in Nashville, Tennessee.

Discography

Solo discography
The In Harmonica (1965, as Larry Nelson)
Mountain Moods (1989)
Urban Gypsy (1990)

Session work

With The Everly Brothers

• Beat & Soul ( Warner Brothers ,1965)

With the Byrds
 Mr. Tambourine Man (Columbia, 1965)
 "Glory, Glory" on the album Byrdmaniax (1971)
With the We Three Trio
 The We Three Trio (Mainstream S/6055,56055, 1965)
With Barbra Streisand
 Stoney End (Columbia Records, 1971)
 Barbra Joan Streisand (Columbia Records, 1971)
With the Beach Boys
 Pet Sounds (Capitol, 1966)
With The Doors
 The Doors (Elektra, 1967)
With Elvis Presley
 Elvis Presley (RCA, 1968)
With Cher
 Stars (Warner Bros. Records, 1975)
With the Dameans
 Walk to the Gloryland (RCA, 1971)With Simon & Garfunkel Sounds of Silence (Columbia Records, 1966)
 Bookends (Columbia, 1968)
 Bridge over Troubled Water (Columbia, 1970)With Solomon Burke Electronic Magnetism (MGM Records, 1971)With the Mamas and the Papas Deliver (Dunhill, Feb. 1967)
The Papas & The Mamas (Dunhill, 1968)With Emitt Rhodes The American Dreams (A&M Records, 1970)With Elvis Costello Mighty Like a Rose (Warner Bros. Records, 1991)
 Kojak Variety (Warner Bros. Records, 1995)With Paul Simon Paul Simon (Columbia Records, 1972)With Chet Baker Blood, Chet and Tears (Verve, 1970)With Dave Mason Alone Together (Blue Thumb/Harvest, 1970)With Nancy Sinatra Sugar (Reprise Records, 1966)With Albert Hammond Albert Hammond (Mums Records, 1974)With Howard Roberts Antelope Freeway (Impulse!, 1971)With Cass Elliott Dream a Little Dream (Dunhill Records, 1968)
 Bubblegum, Lemonade, and... Something for Mama (Dunhill Records, 1969)With Evie Sands Any Way That You Want Me (Rev-Ola, 1970)With Thelma Houston Sunshower (Dunhill Records, 1969)
 I've Got the Music in Me (Sheffield Lab Records, 1975)With Glen Campbell Reunion: The Songs of Jimmy Webb (Capitol Records, 1974)
 Unconditional Love (Liberty Records, 1991)With Jerry Garcia Reflections (Round Records, 1976)With Peter Allen I Could Have Been a Sailor (A&M Records, 1979)With Harry Nilsson Harry (RCA Victor, 1969)With Dan Hill If Dreams Had Wings (Epic Records, 1980)With Barry Mann Survivor (RCA Victor, 1975)With Lalo Schifrin Rock Requiem (Verve, 1971)With Roy Orbison King of Hearts (Virgin Records, 1992)With Jimmy Webb El Mirage (Atlantic Records, 1977)With José Feliciano 10 to 23 (RCA Victor, 1969)
 Compartments (RCA Victor, 1973)With Jackie DeShannon New Arrangement (Columbia Records, 1975)With Brian Cadd Yesterdaydreams (Capitol Records, 1978)With Ron Davies Silent Song Through the Land (A&M Records, 1970)With Bobby Darin If I Were a Carpenter (Atlantic Records, 1966)With Art Garfunkel Angel Clare (Columbia Records, 1973)
 Fate for Breakfast (Columbia Records, 1979)
 Scissors Cut (Columbia Records, 1981)With Stephen Bishop Careless (ABC Records, 1976)With David Clayton-Thomas David Clayton-Thomas (Columbia Records, 1972)With Jackie Lomax Is This What You Want? (Apple Records, 1969)With Billy Joel Cold Spring Harbor (Columbia Records, 1971)
 Streetlife Serenade (Columbia Records, 1974)With Barry McGuire Seeds (Myrrh, 1973)
 Lighten Up (Myrrh, 1974)With Paul Young The Crossing (Columbia Records, 1993)With Dolly Parton 9 to 5 and Odd Jobs (RCA Records, 1980)With Al Kooper Easy Does It (Columbia Records, 1970)With Johnny Rivers Changes (Imperial Records, 1966)
 Whisky Á Go-Go Revisited (Sunset Records, 1967)
 Rewind (Imperial Records, 1967)
 Realization (Imperial Records, 1968)
 Slim Slo Slider (Imperial Records, 1970)
 Home Grown (United Artists Records, 1970)
 L.A. Reggae (United Artists Records, 1972)
 Blue Suede Shoes (United Artists Records, 1973)
 New Lovers and Old Friends (Epic Records, 1975)
 Wild Night (United Artists Records, 1977)
 Not a Through Street (CBS, 1983)With John Denver The Flower That Shattered the Stone (Windstar Records, 1990)With Chet Atkins Read My Licks (Columbia, 1994)With Helen Reddy Helen Reddy (Capitol Records, 1971)With Joan Baez Diamonds & Rust (A&M Records, 1975)
 Gulf Winds (A&M Records, 1976)
 Blowin' Away (Portrait Records, 1977)With Arlen Roth 
 Toolin' Around (Blue Plate, 1993, Aquinnah, 2015)With Neil Diamond'''
 Tap Root Manuscript (Uni Records, 1970)
 Beautiful Noise (Columbia Records, 1976)
 Lovescape (Columbia Records, 1991)
 12 Songs'' (Columbia Records, 2005)

References

External links
List of Larry Knechtel's session contributions

1940 births
2009 deaths
People from Bell, California
Guitarists from Los Angeles
American session musicians
American rock guitarists
American male bass guitarists
American rock pianists
American male pianists
American rock keyboardists
American harmonica players
American male guitarists
American multi-instrumentalists
American rock bass guitarists
The Wrecking Crew (music) members
Grammy Award winners
20th-century American bass guitarists
20th-century American pianists
American male organists
American harpsichordists
Harmonium players
20th-century organists
20th-century American male musicians
21st-century American keyboardists
21st-century American male musicians
20th-century American keyboardists
20th-century classical musicians
American organists